The Artios Award for Outstanding Achievement in Casting – Big Budget Feature (Drama) is an award handed out annually by the Casting Society of America. The award, in its current incarnation, was first awarded in 2009, when the category made the distinction of award comedic films with larger budgets, and studio backing. Previously, since the second awards ceremony in 1986, the category had only held the distinction of Outstanding Achievement in Feature Film Casting – Drama. The award honors the casting directors of higher-budgeted, in comparison to independently-backed, films that the voting body believes featured the best casting.

Winners and nominees

1980s
Outstanding Achievement in Feature Film Casting

Outstanding Achievement in Feature Film Casting – Drama

1990s

2000s

Outstanding Achievement in Casting: Studio Feature – Drama

Outstanding Achievement in Casting: Big Budget Feature (Drama)

2010s

Individuals with multiple awards

4 awards
 Francine Maisler

3 awards
 Howard Feuer
 Debra Zane

2 awards
 Meagan Lewis
 Carolyn Pickman

Individuals with multiple nominations

16 nominations
 Francine Maisler

11 nominations
 Ellen Chenoweth
 Avy Kaufman

8 nominations
 Ellen Lewis

7 nominations
 Debra Zane

6 nominations
 Howard Feuer
 Janet Hirshenson
 Jane Jenkins
 Carolyn Pickman

5 nominations
 Deborah Aquila

4 nominations
 Sarah Halley Finn
 Risa Bramon Garcia
 Randi Hiller
 Lora Kennedy
 Johanna Ray
 David Rubin

3 nominations
 Kerry Barden
 Lisa Beach
 Jackie Burch
 Reuben Cannon
 Denise Chamian
 Mike Fenton
 Mali Finn
 Richard Hicks
 Billy Hopkins
 Ronna Kress
 Meagan Lewis
 Laray Mayfield
 John Papsidera
 Paul Schnee
 Margery Simkin
 Lucinda Syson
 Judy Taylor
 Juliet Taylor
 Victoria Thomas
 Cindy Tolan
 Mary Vernieu
 April Webster

2 nominations
 Donna M. Belajac
 Tara Feldstein Bennett
 Rori Bergman
 Jo Edna Boldin
 Jo Doster 
 Jane Feinberg
 Mark Fincannon
 Nina Gold
 Pat Golden
 Lindsay Graham
 Phyllis Huffman
 Donna Isaacson
 Sheila Jaffe
 Heidi Levitt
 John Lyons
 Joey Montenarello
 Pat Moran
 Chase Paris
 Mickie Paskal
 Angela Peri
 Adam Richards
 Kate Sprance
 Bernard Telsey
 Rachel Tenner
 Amber Wakefield
 Ronnie Yeskel

References

American film awards
Casting awards